Prey is the thirteenth novel by Michael Crichton under his own name and the twenty-third overall. It was first published in November 2002, making it his first novel of the twenty-first century. An excerpt was first published in the January–February 2003 issue of Seed magazine. Prey brings together themes from two earlier Crichton best-selling novels, Jurassic Park and The Andromeda Strain and serves as a cautionary tale about developments in science and technology, in particular, nanotechnology, genetic engineering, and distributed artificial intelligence.

The book features relatively new advances in the computing/scientific community, such as artificial life, emergence (and by extension, complexity), genetic algorithms, and agent-based computing. Fields such as population dynamics and host-parasite coevolution are also at the heart of the novel.

Film rights to the book were purchased by 20th Century Fox.

Plot summary

The novel is narrated by protagonist Jack Forman, an unemployed software programmer taking the role of a house husband. His wife, Julia, serves as a high ranking executive for a Nanorobotics company called Xymos. Julia claims to be working on revolutionary imaging technology, which takes up most of her time. Her intense focus on work creates distance between herself and her family, but Jack believes Julia may be having an affair.

One night, Julia shows Jack a video of Xymos nanobots being injected into a human test subject. Jack is impressed, but grows more suspicious as he notices the video was not filmed on the day, she claimed it to be. 

Later in the night their baby Amanda woke in agony, her body bright red. Jack took her to the hospital, but the doctors could not identify the cause of her pain. She was given an MRI when suddenly her pain stopped, and her skin returned to a normal shade. A bewildered Jack returns home to a strangely indifferent Julia, who leaves in a hurry claiming to be off to an urgent business trip.

A series of strange events lead Jack to suspect something bigger is occurring than what he can see. First, their son Eric claimed to have seen "silver men" cleaning the house in the middle of the night. Next, Jack finds a strange device located underneath Amanda's bed. Soon after, memory chips on Eric's MP3 player turned directly to dust. Julia began to display abusive behavior toward her family, and was seen driving with an unidentifiable passenger. In an unexpected twist, Julia is injured in a car crash leaving Jack to consult for Xymos, as project manager Ricky is struggling with the nanobots.

Jack is taken to the Xymos research facility in Nevada's Basin Desert, where he is given a tour of the lab and introduced to the programming team (Mae, Charley, David, Rosie, Bobby, and Vince.) He is shown a machine used to make nanobot assemblers from bacteria, though Ricky refuses to share the source code for said nanobots. Ricky claims that contractors improperly installed filters in a vent, causing assemblers, bacteria, and nanobots to be blown into the desert, where they began forming into autonomous swarms. These "swarms" appear to be clouds of solar-powered self-sufficient nanobots, reproducing and evolving (necroevolution) at rapid speeds. The swarms exhibit predatory behavior, killing wild animals through the use of a code that Jack himself had worked on. Most alarmingly, the swarm possess rudimentary intelligence, the ability to quickly learn and innovate. Jack learns Julia was helping to make the swarms more benign, but they regressed when she disappeared. The swarms wander around the plant during the day, but go elsewhere when strong winds blow or night falls.

The nanoswarm kills a rabbit directly outside the complex, so Jack goes outside with Mae to inspect. They find the rabbit died of suffocation, meaning the nanobots blocked its bronchial tubes. While investigating the rabbit, Jack is attacked by the swarms and barely manages to get back into the lab before falling unconscious from anaphylactic shock.

Persuaded by Jack, the team decides to destroy the swarm in fear of a grey goo plague endangering humanity. They believe the swarm must have nested in the desert, so they tagged the bots with radioactive isotopes and followed them at night in hopes of finding said nest. Under the cover of a strong wind, the team goes to a storage shack to find the isotopes and begins building a spray device. As the wind dies down, four swarms attack the shack and kill two team members - David and Rosie. The rest of the team is forced to take shelter in nearby parked cars. Jack and Mae manage to escape to the lab unscathed, but Charley falls unconscious outside his car after being attacked. When the others refuse to help, Jack manages to get himself and a semi-conscious Charley to safety.

As night falls, Jack, Mae, and Bobby set out to find the swarms. While searching, they discover that the swarms are dragging Rosie's corpse through the desert. The team is also shocked to discover that the swarms can replicate the physical features, perceptions, and motions of humans when they see the swarms form replicas of Ricky, David, and Rosie.

The group follows Rosie's body and find the swarms nesting in a cave. A Xymos helicopter arrives and wards off the swarms using its draft. Mae and Jack then venture into the cave and succeed in destroying the swarms, their nest, and their organic assembly plant using explosive thermite caps.

Returning to the plant, Jack, Mae, and Bobby are greeted by Julia, who had discharged herself from the hospital and was brought in by the chopper. Julia's behavior is extremely aberrant; she seems to pay heed to nothing except enticing Jack and kissing him, even when Charley is found killed by a swarm in a sabotaged communications room. Jack cannot understand how the swarm got inside the airtight building, why Charley would have disabled the facility's communications, or why Julia and Ricky are acting very out-of-character.

Mae discovers security footage of when they were in the desert. To Jack's horror, the video reveals that Julia and Ricky had an affair, and shows Charley engaging in a vicious fight with Ricky and Vince. All of them end up in the communications room where Julia kisses a subdued Charley, injecting a swarm into his mouth, while Ricky sabotages the communication systems.

Eventually, Jack and Mae realize that Julia, Ricky, Vince and Bobby have all been infected by a symbiotic version of the nanobot swarms. These swarms do not show aggressive predatory behavior; instead, they take over human hosts, affecting their decision-making, and slowly devour them over time to produce more nanobots. This allows the swarms to remain hidden, while also allowing them to spread and contaminate other humans.

Jack comes up with a plan to destroy this new strain. He and Mae drink vials containing a form of phage that kills the nanobot-producing E. coli bacteria, thereby protecting them from infection by the nanobots. Jack then takes a sample of the phage and plans to pour it into the sprinkler system and drench everyone in the facility with it. He has Mae alert Julia and the infected team, who set out to stop Jack. In the vicious struggle that ensues, Jack is captured and thrown into a magnetic chamber. Jack feigns surrender when Julia walks in to interrogate him, but reactivates the magnetic chamber, remembering the incident with Amanda in the MRI. Julia's swarm is pulled away by the magnetic field to temporarily reveal the real Julia, who is gradually being consumed by the parasitic swarm. Before the swarm can repossess her body, Julia begs Jack to forgive her, says she loves him, and tells him to stop the swarms and save their children, as they have been infected too. Motivated, Jack runs to the roof, fights off the infected team, and finally manages to place the sample into the sprinkler system.

To prevent the sprinkler system from triggering, Ricky disables the plant's safety network. This plays in Jack's favor, as Mae has already inserted the phage into the assembly line, causing it to reproduce rapidly. The assembly line is rapidly overheating because of the deactivated safety system. If Ricky and Julia don't turn on the safety system, the assembly line will burst, filling the lab with the phage, but if they turn it on, the sprinklers will activate instead. The infected, now doomed either way, choose to re-activate the network and are drenched with the phage, killing them all. Jack and Mae escape the facility in a helicopter shortly before the facility explodes due to a methane gas leak combined with thermite that Mae had placed in the building. 

After returning home, Jack doses his children and sister with the phage, curing them as well. While Mae calls the U.S. Army and sends a sample of the phage to her lab, Jack puts together all the missing links. The corrosion of the memory chips in his home's electronics and Amanda's skin rash were caused by nanobot assemblers that were accidentally brought home by Julia. The MRI's strong magnetic field detached the assemblers from Amanda. Knowing this, Julia called in the Xymos special team to scan Amanda's room for any additional assemblers. The person whom Jack spotted in Julia's car was in fact the Ricky-swarm. Finally, Jack discovers that Xymos had intentionally released the swarm into the desert so that it would evolve to stay in a cohesive group in the wind, but called him in to destroy the wild strain once it became uncontrollable.

Characters

Major characters
 Jack Forman A former team lead/manager at MediaTronics working on distributed, multi-agent systems and advanced computer algorithms
 Julia Forman Jack's wife, Vice president of the Xymos company.
 Mae Chang A field biologist on Jack's consulting team
 Ricky Morse A friend of Jack's, works for Xymos
 Charley Davenport A member of Jack's team who specializes in genetic algorithms.
 David Brooks An engineer on the team.
 Rosie Castro A specialist in natural language processing.
 The "Swarm" Any of the many predatory clouds of nano-machines that "eat" animals serving as an antagonistic force in the novel. "Eating" means suffocating the animals and growing bacteria on them, thereby producing more nano-machine assemblers, and more nano-machines. A notable aspect of the swarm is its capacity for fully Lamarckian evolution, as each cloud's members can effectively choose exactly which aspects are to be transmitted or modified down into the next generation through manipulation of the E. coli bacteria used to produce the new robots.
 Vince Reynolds the maintenance operator of the Xymos lab.
 Amanda Jack and Julia's baby daughter.
 Nicole Jack and Julia's preteen daughter.
 Eric Jack and Julia's son.

Minor characters
 Ellen Jack's sister from out of town. She takes care of his kids while he is in Nevada and believes Julia is on stimulants.
Don Gross Jack's former boss, who fired Jack.
 Gary Jack's lawyer.
 Maria Jack and Julia's housekeeper.
 Annie Jack's headhunter.
 Carol Julia's assistant.
 Mary Ricky's wife.
 Bobby Lembeck Computer programmer at Xymos 
 Tim Berman The man that took over Jack's job.

Reception
Jim Holt, writing for The New York Times, found the book "absurd" but exciting, and said that he "kept turning the pages feverishly".

Peter Guttridge, writing for The Observer, said that it finds Crichton "doing what he does best", in that he takes "the very latest scientific advances" and shows "their potentially terrifying underbelly".

Even while pointing out the flaws in Crichton's science, in Prey, multiple critics have praised the book's impact and overall message.

See also 
 Nanotechnology in fiction
 The Invincible

References

Novels by Michael Crichton
2002 American novels
2002 science fiction novels
American science fiction novels
Science fiction horror novels
HarperCollins books
Nanopunk
Nanotechnology in fiction
Novels about genetic engineering
Novels about artificial intelligence
Artificial life in fiction
Novels about robots
Deserts in fiction
Hive minds in fiction
Evolution in popular culture
Hard science fiction
American zombie novels